Nathan D'Haemers (born 26 January 1978 in Evergem) is a retired Belgian football player.

References

External links
 
 

1978 births
Living people
Belgian footballers
Belgium international footballers
S.V. Zulte Waregem players
K.S.K. Beveren players
Belgian Pro League players
People from Evergem
Association football midfielders
K.F.C. Eendracht Zele players
Footballers from East Flanders